The 2020–21 Vijay Hazare Trophy was the 19th season of the Vijay Hazare Trophy, a List A cricket tournament in India. The tournament took place from 20 February to 14 March 2021. Karnataka were the defending champions.

In January 2021, the Board of Control for Cricket in India (BCCI) announced that the tournament would take place after the 2020–21 Ranji Trophy was cancelled due to the COVID-19 pandemic. 38 teams were split into six groups, with six teams in Groups A to E and eight teams in the Plate Group. The top five teams from Groups A to E, along with next two highest ranked teams across those groups advanced to the quarter-finals. The next best ranked team in Groups A to E faced the winner of the Plate Group in the Eliminator, with the winner of that fixture also advancing to the quarter-finals.

On the opening day of the tournament, Jharkhand scored 422/9 against Madhya Pradesh, the highest total by any team in the Vijay Hazare Trophy. This record was broken five days later, when Mumbai made 457/4 against Pondicherry. In the match, Mumbai's Prithvi Shaw scored the highest individual total in the Vijay Hazare Trophy, with 227 not out.

Groups A, B and C all concluded on 28 February 2021, with Gujarat, Andhra Pradesh and Karnataka all winning their respective groups to qualify for the knockout stage of the tournament. The remaining three groups finished on the following day, with Mumbai and Saurashtra winning Groups D and E respectively, and Uttarakhand winning the Plate Group. Uttar Pradesh and Kerala qualified for the knockout stage as the next two best-placed teams, with Delhi facing Uttarakhand in the Eliminator match. Delhi beat Uttarakhand by four wickets in the Eliminator match to join the other seven teams in the quarter-finals.

On day one of the quarter-finals, Gujarat beat Andhra Pradesh by 116 runs, and Karnataka beat Kerala by 80 runs to progress. In the remaining two quarter-final matches, Uttar Pradesh beat Delhi by 46 runs, and Mumbai beat Saurashtra by nine wickets. The first semi-final saw Uttar Pradesh beat Gujarat by five wickets, with Mumbai beating the defending champions Karnataka by 72 runs in the second semi-final. Mumbai won the tournament, to take their fourth title, beating Uttar Pradesh by six wickets in the final.

League stage

Group A

Group B

Group C

Group D

Group E

Plate Group

Knockout stage

Eliminator

Quarter-finals

Semi-finals

Final

References

External links
 Series home at ESPN Cricinfo

Vijay Hazare Trophy
Vijay Hazare Trophy